The olive snout-burrower (Hemisus olivaceus), or olive shovelnose frog, is a species of frog in the family Hemisotidae, found in Democratic Republic of the Congo and possibly Uganda.
Its natural habitats are subtropical or tropical moist lowland forests, swamps, freshwater marshes, and intermittent freshwater marshes.
It is threatened by habitat loss.

References

Hemisus
Taxonomy articles created by Polbot
Amphibians described in 1963
Endemic fauna of the Democratic Republic of the Congo